Directive 82/501/EC was a European Union law aimed at improving the safety of sites containing large quantities of dangerous substances. It is also known as the Seveso Directive, after the Seveso disaster. It was superseded by the Seveso II Directive and then Seveso III directive.

See also
 Seveso II Directive
 Control of Major Accident Hazards Regulations 1999

External links
 Council Directive 96/82/EC of 9 December 1996 on the control of major-accident hazards involving dangerous substances
 Summaries of EU legislation > Environment > Civil protection > Major accidents involving dangerous substances
 European Commission page about the Seveso Directives

82 501
Chemical safety
1982 in law
1982 in the European Economic Community
Environmental law in the European Union

fr:Directive Seveso
it:Direttiva Seveso